Joseph Vincent Claude Savoie (July 30, 1916 – May 29, 1990) was a Canadian politician. He served in the Legislative Assembly of New Brunswick from 1957 to 1967 as member of the Liberal party.

References

1916 births
1990 deaths